Yerazgavors may refer to:
Shirakavan (ancient city), an ancient city and one of the historic capitals of Armenia formerly known as Yerazgavors
Yerazgavors, Armenia, a village in the Shirak Province of Armenia